The women's +52 kg event in bodybuilding at the 2001 World Games in Akita was played from 18 to 19 August. The bodybuilding competition took place at Akita City Culture Hall.

Competition format
A total of 8 athletes entered the competition.

Results

References

External links
 Results on IWGA website

Bodybuilding at the 2001 World Games